Kanogawa Dam (Pre) is a gravity dam located in Ehime Prefecture in Japan. The dam is used for flood control and power production. The catchment area of the dam is 513 km2. The dam impounds about 232  ha of land when full and can store 48200 thousand cubic meters of water. The construction of the dam was started on 1953 and completed in 1958. It was repaired in 2018.

References

Dams in Ehime Prefecture
1958 establishments in Japan